Collis is an unincorporated community in Tara Township, Traverse County, in the U.S. state of Minnesota.

Birthplace of William Jerome O’Donnell aka The Stallion

History
A post office called Collis was established in 1885, and remained in operation until 1954. The community was named after the Hill of Tara, collis meaning "hill" in Latin.

References

Unincorporated communities in Traverse County, Minnesota
Unincorporated communities in Minnesota